The 2020–21 Texas State Bobcats men's basketball team represented Texas State University in the 2020–21 NCAA Division I men's basketball season. The Bobcats, led by first-year interim head coach Terrence Johnson, played their home games at Strahan Arena in San Marcos, Texas as members of the Sun Belt Conference. With the creation of divisions to cut down on travel due to the COVID-19 pandemic, they played in the West Division.

Previous season
The Bobcats finished the 2019–20 season 21–11, 13–7 in Sun Belt play to finish in a tie for second place. They defeated Appalachian State in the quarterfinals of the Sun Belt tournament and were set to face South Alabama in the semifinals until the tournament was cancelled amid the COVID-19 pandemic.

On September 22, 2020, head coach Danny Kaspar resigned amid allegations of racially insensitive language used at players. He finished at Texas State with a seven-year record of 119–109.

Roster

Schedule and results

|-
!colspan=12 style=| Non-conference regular season

|-
!colspan=9 style=| Sun Belt Conference regular season

|-
!colspan=12 style=| Sun Belt tournament

Source

References

Texas State Bobcats men's basketball seasons
Texas State Bobcats
Texas State Bobcats men's basketball
Texas State Bobcats men's basketball